Perfluoroheptane, C7F16, (usually referring to the straight chain molecule called n-perfluoroheptane) is a perfluorocarbon.  It is hydrophobic (water-insoluble) and oleophobic (oil-insoluble). It is used in deacidification of paper as a medium carrying powdered magnesium oxide.

References

Perfluoroalkanes